Tehran City Council was the directly-elected city council of Tehran and the first such institution to convene in Iran, serving as a model for other city councils in the country. It formalized selection of Mayor of Tehran, designated by the Ministry of Interior. The council had 30 members and 12 committees each with 5 members, with each member able to chair in up to two. The members met once per week in an open session attended by the mayor and journalists.

The council suffered from the weakness of democratic accountability, lack of administrational and financial autonomy and limited scope of authority.

The last elections to the council took place in 1976 and it was abolished in 1979 when the Iranian Revolution took place.

References 

Government of Tehran
Tehran
1968 establishments in Iran
1979 disestablishments in Iran